Parviz, Zahedan is a village in Ladiz Rural District, in the Nosratabad of Zahedan County, Sistan and Baluchestan Province, Iran. At the 2006 census, its population was 183, in 31 families.

References 

Populated places in Zahedan County